Fox Hollow is a valley in Oregon County in the U.S. state of Missouri.

Fox Hollow was so named on account of foxes in the area.

References

Valleys of Oregon County, Missouri
Valleys of Missouri